Kenneth Scott Cooper Jr. (born October 21, 1984) is an American former soccer player who played as a forward. He began his soccer career with Manchester United but failed to break through to the first team. He went on to play for clubs in Portugal, Germany, England, the United States, and Canada.

Early life
Cooper's father, Kenny Cooper Sr., played professional soccer as a goalkeeper in England before moving to the United States to play for Dallas Tornado of the North American Soccer League. Cooper was born in Baltimore, Maryland, and, under the mentorship of his father, he became an outstanding youth player. After retiring from coaching professional soccer, Cooper's father had settled the family in Dallas, Texas, where Cooper attended high school at Jesuit College Preparatory School of Dallas. He was the Dallas area high school player of the year while playing, graduating in 2003.

Club career

Manchester United
While playing with the Dallas Solar 85 Soccer Club in the Dallas Cup, an international youth tournament, Cooper caught the attention of several former NASL players who contacted Jimmy Ryan, Director of Youth Football at Manchester United. Ryan had also once played with Cooper's father when they were both with the Tornado. Ryan contacted the Coopers and invited Kenny to England for a trial. The fact that Cooper's father was a native of England helped grease the skids for Cooper as United did not need to acquire a work permit for him. Following a successful week-long trial, United signed him on a free transfer. At the time Cooper had intended to attend Southern Methodist University, but decided to forgo playing college soccer in order to pursue his professional career.

FC Dallas
Cooper signed with FC Dallas on February 6, 2006, and made an immediate impact on the team. He made his first MLS appearance on April 1, 2006, and scored his first MLS career goal helping FC Dallas to a 3–2 victory against the Chicago Fire. Cooper made his first MLS start the following week against Real Salt Lake on April 8, 2006, scoring the team's first goal in a 2–1 victory. He finished his first MLS season tied for sixth in goals scored with 11 and made 31 appearances. At the start of the 2007 MLS Season, Cooper scored four goals in the first eight games before he suffered a broken right tibia in a 3–1 win against the Los Angeles Galaxy by a strong tackle from Tyrone Marshall that put him out for a majority of the season. This ended his hopes of playing in the 2007 Copa América and for the national team. Cooper ended the 2007 season with a total of 12 starts out of 14 appearances, four goals, and two assists.

Cooper was linked with a possible move to Cardiff City on July 27, 2008, after the club made a £2,000,000 bid. Norway's Rosenborg bid more than that and also offered a salary of $1.2 million. MLS ultimately rejected both bids and decided to keep him.

In the 2008 MLS season, Cooper led FC Dallas with 18 goals and started all 30 games. He was the only FC Dallas player to appear in all regular season games that year. Cooper finished the season tied for the league lead with four game-winning goals. Fourteen of Cooper's 18 goals either tied or gave FC Dallas the lead, while the other four goals helped increase the team's lead. He was named to his first MLS All-Star First XI selection and MLS Best XI team. He earned back-to-back MLS Player of the Week honours for his two-goal performances against the Los Angeles Galaxy (4–0 win) on July 27, 2008, and Toronto FC (2–0 win) on August 8, 2008. Cooper was also named the MLS Comeback Player of the Year for 2008.

1860 Munich

On July 31, 2009, FC Dallas announced that Cooper had been sold to 2. Bundesliga club TSV 1860 Munich. As per league policy, terms of the deal were not disclosed. However, German teams do disclose the amounts of transfers, Cooper was sold for $700,000 in 2009 it is known that the contract ran for three years. He scored his first goal for 1860 Munich in his debut on August 9, 2009.

Plymouth Argyle
On January 28, 2010, Cooper left Munich to return to England, signing for Plymouth Argyle on loan until the end of the 2009–10 season with a view to a permanent move at the end of the season. However, this option was not taken up by the club.

Portland Timbers
On January 13, 2011, TSV 1860 Munich announced that Cooper would not fulfil his contract which had been set to run until June 2012 and would be joining Portland Timbers on a free transfer. While Timbers technical director Gavin Wilkinson initially cautioned that a deal had yet to be struck, on January 17, 2011, he announced Portland had finally completed Cooper's transfer and that he would be joining the team pending the receipt of his International Transfer Certificate. He scored the first MLS goal for the Portland Timbers in a 3–1 loss on their MLS debut, against Colorado Rapids on March 19, 2011. He scored his third goal of the season in a 1–0 win over Real Salt Lake. This marked the Timbers first shutout win and snapped Salt Lake's 18-game unbeaten streak.

New York Red Bulls
On January 12, 2012, Cooper was traded to the New York Red Bulls for a first-round 2013 MLS SuperDraft pick and an undisclosed amount of allocation money. He made his MLS regular season debut with the New York Red Bulls on Sunday, March 11, and scored his first goal for the Red Bulls against FC Dallas, his former team, at FC Dallas Stadium. Cooper was the top scorer for the team during the 2012 MLS Season.

FC Dallas
Cooper was re-acquired by FC Dallas from New York on February 4, 2013, in exchange for allocation money. He appeared in 31 regular-season games during the 2013 season, scoring 6 goals.

Seattle Sounders FC
Having failed to agree to a new contract with FC Dallas, Cooper was due to be made available in the 2013 MLS Re-Entry Draft. However, on 13 December 2013, prior to the draft, Seattle Sounders FC announced that they had acquired the rights to negotiate a contract with Cooper, as well as allocation money, in exchange for midfielder Adam Moffat, and signed him to a contract on December 19, 2013. In his first season with the club Cooper helped Seattle in capturing the 2014 Lamar Hunt U.S. Open Cup scoring six goals in four games, including a two-goal, two-assist effort in the semifinals against Chicago on August 13. He was named the U.S. Open Cup Player of the Tournament.

Montreal Impact
On April 12, 2015, Cooper moved to Montreal Impact via MLS waivers. He made only one appearance with the club due to an injury.

Cooper had trials with Orlando City SC, New York Red Bulls, Sporting Kansas City, and FC Dallas but no playing contracts were agreed.

International career
After the retirement of Brian McBride, Cooper was considered to be a potential long-term solution at striker for the national team. Cooper got his first cap and first goal for the national team on January 20, 2007, against Denmark where he scored a goal after coming on near the end of the game. He then appeared in a game against Guatemala, which was played in his MLS club's home stadium, Pizza Hut Park, as a second half sub. He was unable to take part in the 2007 Copa América after he was sidelined with a broken right tibia. On November 20, 2008, Cooper got his first World Cup Qualifying start and his first World Cup qualifying-round goal against Guatemala in the final game of the semifinal group stage. On July 18, 2009, Cooper took a boot to the chest from Roman Torres of Panama, resulting in a penalty kick which he took to put the U.S. through to the semifinal round of the CONCACAF Gold Cup. Five days later, Cooper scored near the end of the match against Honduras to give the U.S. a 2–0 lead and to put them safely into the final of the 2009 CONCACAF Gold Cup. He has a total of 10 international appearances (caps) with 4 goals.

Personal life
Cooper married Molly Grimm in Charleston, South Carolina on January 7, 2012. Currently, he lives in Charleston where he is involved with youth soccer coaching.

Career statistics

Club

International
Scores and results list United States' goal tally first, score column indicates score after each Cooper goal.

|+ List of international goals scored by Kenny Cooper
|-
| style="text-align:center"|1 || January 20, 2007 || Home Depot Center, Carson, United States ||  || style="text-align:center"|3–1 || style="text-align:center"|3–1 || Friendly || 
|-
| style="text-align:center"|2 || November 20, 2008 || Dick's Sporting Goods Park, Denver, United States ||  || style="text-align:center"|1–0 || style="text-align:center"|2–0 || 2010 FIFA World Cup qualification || 
|-
| style="text-align:center"|3 || July 19, 2009 || Lincoln Financial Field, Philadelphia, United States ||  || style="text-align:center"|2–1 || style="text-align:center"|2–1 || 2009 CONCACAF Gold Cup || 
|-
| style="text-align:center"|4 || July 24, 2009 || Soldier Field, Chicago, United States ||  || style="text-align:center"|2–0 || style="text-align:center"|2–0 || 2009 CONCACAF Gold Cup || 
|}

Honours
Individual
 MLS Best XI: 2008
 CONCACAF Gold Cup All-Tournament Team: 2009

References

External links
 
 
 
 

1984 births
Living people
American people of English descent
American soccer players
Soccer players from Maryland
Soccer players from Dallas
Association football forwards
Manchester United F.C. players
American expatriate soccer players
Expatriate footballers in England
Associação Académica de Coimbra – O.A.F. players
American expatriate sportspeople in Portugal
Expatriate footballers in Portugal
Oldham Athletic A.F.C. players
English Football League players
FC Dallas players
Portland Timbers players
New York Red Bulls players
Seattle Sounders FC players
CF Montréal players
FC Montreal players
United States men's international soccer players
TSV 1860 Munich players
Expatriate soccer players in Canada
American expatriate soccer players in Germany
Plymouth Argyle F.C. players
2009 CONCACAF Gold Cup players
Major League Soccer players
Major League Soccer All-Stars
2. Bundesliga players
USL Championship players
Jesuit College Preparatory School of Dallas alumni